Satyros or Satyrus was a Greek architect in the 4th century BC. Along with Pythius of Priene, he designed and oversaw the construction of the Mausoleum at Halicarnassus.

Mausolus, the satrap of Caria in southwest Anatolia died in 353 BC, and his widow, Artemisia II of Caria, ordered the construction of a huge marble tomb in his memory at Halicarnassus – now Bodrum, Turkey – which was completed about 350 BC. Its name, the Mausoleum, became the generic term for monumental tombs. It was one of the Seven Wonders of the Ancient World, and was eventually destroyed by an earthquake.

References
Notes

Ancient Greek architects
4th-century BC Greek people